The 2018–19 season was Newcastle United's second season back in the Premier League following their promotion from the 2016–17 EFL Championship and their 24th year in the Premier League. This season Newcastle United participated in the Premier League, EFL Cup and FA Cup. This article covers the period of 1 July 2018 to 30 June 2019.

Club

Coaching staff
The Newcastle United first team coaching staff for the 2018–19 season consisted of the following:

First Team

Squads

First-team squad

Transfers and loans

Transfers in

 Total spending:  £43,500,000

Transfers out

 Total incoming:  ~ £44,250,000

Loans in

Loans out

Pre-season and friendlies

As of 14 June 2018, Newcastle United have announced five pre-season friendlies against St Patrick's Athletic, Hull City, FC Porto, S.C. Braga and FC Augsburg.

On 7 February 2019, Newcastle United confirmed a mid-season training camp in Spain which included a friendly against CSKA Moscow.

Competitions

Overall summary

Overview

Goals
Last updated on 12 May 2019.

Clean sheets
Last updated on 12 May 2019.

References

Newcastle United F.C. seasons
Newcastle United